Deodato Bocconi (also Deodato Boctoni) (died 1477) was a Roman Catholic prelate who served as Bishop of Ajaccio (1457–1477).

Biography
On 20 May 1457, Deodato Bocconi was appointed during the papacy of Pope Sixtus IV as Bishop of Ajaccio. He served as Bishop of Ajaccio until his death in 1477. While bishop, he was the principal co-consecrator of Diego de Moiras, Bishop of Tui (1473); Nicolas de Caffa, Bishop of Toul (1473); and Fernando de Castilla, Bishop of Granada (1474).

References 

15th-century Italian Roman Catholic bishops
Bishops appointed by Pope Sixtus IV
1477 deaths